Whetstone is a village and civil parish in the Blaby district of Leicestershire, England and largely acts as a commuter village for Leicester, five miles to the north. The population at the 2011 census was 6,556.  It is part of the Leicester Urban Area.

The village is bounded on the east by the A426 (on the other side of which is Blaby village), to the north by the railway line from Birmingham to Leicester, and to the west by the M1.  It is well connected to Leicester City centre, with a very frequent direct bus service. From 1899 to 1963 the village was served by Whetstone railway station.

Whetstone was the site of Frank Whittle's factory, where jet engines were developed. Babcock Services, ITP Engines Ltd and Converteam now occupy much of the site. Smaller companies rent space, mainly for storing commercial vehicles. Until 2002 the site sounded an Air Raid Siren at 8am every Wednesday.

The site of the Whittle factory became the English Electric Company (later GEC). A significant part of several nuclear power stations was made there in the 1960s and 70s. English Electric was one of the largest engineering companies in the Leicester area, employing thousands of workers and training hundreds of apprentices each year. At one point more than 4,000 workers had to be shipped in from Middlesex to reduce labour shortages. Many settled permanently, causing a boom in the late 60s.

The computer performance measurement called the "Whetstone" was named for the Whetstone ALGOL compiler, developed by English Electric at the factory; it thus takes its name from the village.

Apart from Blaby, nearby places are Enderby, Glen Parva, Countesthorpe, Cosby, Littlethorpe and Narborough.

There are two schools in Whetstone: Badgerbrook primary school and St Peter's primary school.

Whetstone has several football clubs: Blaby and Whetstone Boys, Whetstone Juniors and Saffron Dynamo. Holmes Park is the home of the Leicester & Rutland County FA. Holmes Park is also home to the Leicester City Football Club Under 23s.

An amateur rugby union club, Vipers RFC, is based in the village. Another rugby club in Whetstone is the Leicester Lions RFC which is situated on the outskirts of Whetstone, the National Tap Dancing Doubles (over 60s) competition held every year.

Whetstone holds an annual Remembrance Parade led by the Church Lads and Church Girls Brigade, supported by 1st Whetstone Scouts and 1st Whetstone Guides.

References

External links

Whetstone Village Web Site
Whetstone Parish Council

Villages in Leicestershire
Civil parishes in Leicestershire
Blaby